Fort Miles was a United States Army World War II installation located on Cape Henlopen near Lewes, Delaware. Although funds to build the fort were approved in 1934, it was 1938 before construction began on the fort. On 3 June 1941 it was named for Lieutenant General Nelson A. Miles.

As the primary fort of the Harbor Defenses of the Delaware, it was built to defend Delaware Bay and the Delaware River and to protect domestic shipping from enemy fire between Cape May and Cape Henlopen, particularly from the German surface fleet. The fort also operated a controlled underwater minefield to prevent ships entering the Delaware River estuary. One of these mines was revealed following 2016 Hurricane Hermine by local Cape Henlopen state park staff. The sea mine and anchor were archaeologically conserved.

By 1950 the Army's coast defense role had been transferred to the Navy and coastal artillery defenses were obsolete with the fort becoming surplus. The Army continued to use portions and in 1962 the Navy established Naval Facility (NAVFAC) Lewes, a Sound Surveillance System (SOSUS) shore terminal there to replace the one at Cape May across the bay in New Jersey that was damaged in a storm. The NAVFAC was in commission 1 May 1962 to 30 September 1981. The headquarters building now houses the Biden Environmental Conference Center.

The fort is now Cape Henlopen State Park.

World War I
In 1917 a single  gun was placed on Cape Henlopen, with another at the Cape May Military Reservation in New Jersey. These were removed after the war.

World War II
Prior to World War II the Harbor Defenses of the Delaware consisted primarily of Fort Saulsbury near Slaughter Beach, Delaware, accepted for service in 1924. This fort had four  guns on long-range carriages, but was unaccompanied by smaller guns. It had effectively replaced several forts much further upriver, centered on Fort Delaware near Delaware City, though these remained armed until Fort Miles was built in World War II. The Delaware River was one of the coast defense areas of the US that most demonstrated the tendency of defenses to move seaward as gun range increased.

The outbreak of war in Europe in September 1939 and the Fall of France in June 1940 greatly accelerated US defense planning and funding. On 27 July 1940 the Army's Harbor Defense Board recommended the construction of 27 (eventually 38)  two-gun batteries to protect strategic points along the US coastline, to be casemated against air attack. Two of these batteries were to be at Fort Miles, initially called the Cape Henlopen Military Reservation. Construction on the first one, Battery 118 (later named Battery Smith, after Major General William Ruthven Smith), began on 24 March 1941.

The first operational guns at the fort were four mobile  guns, which deployed to the fort on 15 April 1941 with two partial batteries of the 21st Coast Artillery Regiment. Concrete "Panama mounts" for these were completed in June 1942. On 5 June 1941 elements of the 261st Coast Artillery Battalion of the Delaware National Guard arrived.

The attack on Pearl Harbor accelerated construction and other activity at the fort.  The United States declaration of war on Japan compelled the U.S. Army to continue to garrison the fort with the 261st Coast Artillery Battalion, who days before were slated to leave.  Fourteen vessels, including USS Jacob Jones, a U.S. Navy destroyer, were sunk off the coast of New Jersey during the first six months of 1942.  Numerous batteries (ranging from  guns up to ) were installed at the fort and a large mine field was laid in the waters off Lewes, Delaware in the following years, but the fort was to see no action during the conflict.  In May 1945, the soldiers would receive the surrender of U-858, a German U-boat that was part of Wolfpack Seewolf at the time of the German surrender to Allied forces in Europe.  The U-858 was the first enemy ship to surrender to United States forces following the defeat of Germany in World War II

On 14 March 1942 Battery C of the 52nd Coast Artillery (CA) (Railway) regiment arrived with four  railway guns. By 10 September this battery was joined by Battery D with the same armament; Batteries C and D were initially the 2nd Battalion of the 52nd CA, and were redesignated as the 287th Coast Artillery (Railway) Battalion on 1 May 1943. Another early battery was the "examination battery", Battery 5 of four  guns, completed 31 August 1942 and transferred for use 11 December 1943. Two guns each were taken from Fort Delaware and Fort Wadsworth, New York for this battery. In October 1942 the structure of Battery 118 (Smith) was completed, and in December 1942 the  guns were mounted, but the battery was not transferred for use until 21 December 1943.

In late 1942 construction had yet to begin on Battery 119, the second  gun battery at the fort. Battery 119 was cancelled and replaced with Battery 519, a casemated battery of two  guns relocated from Fort Saulsbury. Construction began on Battery 519 on 15 November 1942, was completed on 31 August 1943, and the battery was transferred for use on 15 February 1944.

Batteries 221 (Herring) and 222 (Hunter) were completed in August 1943 and October 1943, and transferred in March 1944 and December 1943, respectively. Each of these had two  guns on high-angle shielded barbette carriages, with a concrete-and-earth bunker for ammunition and fire control.

Two  gun Anti-Motor Torpedo Boat (AMTB) batteries were at Fort Miles as AMTB 5A and AMTB 5B. These were dual-purpose (anti-surface and anti-aircraft) guns. Each battery was authorized two  guns on fixed mounts, two on towed mounts, and two single  Bofors guns, although the weapons on hand may have varied. Both were completed in June 1943 and transferred in December 1943.

Fort Miles was supplemented by three batteries at the Cape May Military Reservation in New Jersey. The first was Battery 25 with four  guns on Panama mounts, built in 1942. Battery 223, a  battery similar to Batteries 221 and 222 at Fort Miles, was built in 1943. A  gun battery was also built at Cape May in 1943.

At its peak, Fort Miles was home to over 2,200 soldiers, men and women, including the 261st Coast Artillery Battalion, the 21st Coast Artillery Regiment, part of the 52nd Coast Artillery (Railway), and a detachment of the 113th Infantry Regiment.

Fort Miles never saw any major action during World War II, firing its guns many times in practice and achieving high marksmanship ratings but never using those guns to engage an enemy. A  gun was fired exactly once in testing, and the resulting recoil damaged the emplacement, resulting in no further shells fired from Battery Smith.

Fire control towers, four- to five-story round-base concrete towers with flat observation decks, were set up along the coast as baselines to triangulate the position of suspicious ships or submarines. Five such towers still exist within the current boundaries of Cape Henlopen State Park, including one (#7) that has visitor access. Many bunkers were also constructed to house guns and other weapons. Barracks, administration buildings, and a pier were also constructed as part of the fort.

With a significantly reduced threat from enemy surface forces, in March 1944 the first of several drawdowns at Fort Miles commenced. The Headquarters and Headquarters Battery (HHB) of the 261st Coast Artillery Battalion (CA Bn) moved to Fort Jackson, South Carolina in March and was inactivated there on 20 April, with personnel transferred to field artillery units. The remainder of the 261st CA Bn became components of the 21st CA at Fort Miles. In April 1944 the 8-inch railway gun battalion (287th CA Bn) relocated to Fort Bragg, North Carolina and was reorganized as a field artillery battalion. In October 1944 the 21st CA was itself reduced to a battalion with the same number and placed under the Eastern Defense Command, and on 1 April 1945 was inactivated, with remaining personnel at Fort Miles transferring to the Harbor Defenses of the Delaware.

Weaponry
The four largest coastal batteries at Fort Miles are Battery 118 (Battery Smith), Battery 221 (Battery Herring), Battery 222 (Battery Hunter), and Battery 519.  Due to the late date of its completion, Battery 519 was never formally named and was only designated by its Army Corps of Engineers construction number.

Cold War
Most of Fort Miles was declared surplus in 1948 and 1949, but the Army continued to use portions of it through the early 1990s as a Morale, Welfare and Recreation (MWR) area for active and retired military personnel and their families, with the facility coming under the management of Fort Meade. In 1964, 543 acres (2.2 km²) of federal land were donated to the State of Delaware to establish Cape Henlopen State Park. Over time, more land was transferred to the state park until Fort Miles ceased operation as a military MWR facility altogether in 1991, as part of the Base Realignment and Closure Commission (BRAC) process. Fort Miles, consisting of approximately 96 acres, was transferred to the State of Delaware only for public park or recreational purposes.  The State of Delaware reimbursed the Army MWR fund $14,369 for expenses expended to improve the property. Its last official usage was as a bivouac for soldiers who had just returned from the first Gulf War.

In 1962, the U.S. Navy took control of a portion of the southern end of Fort Miles, including Batteries Smith and Herring, to establish Naval Facility Lewes (NAVFAC Lewes), a Sound Surveillance System (SOSUS) shore terminal. The terminus had been at Cape May, New Jersey until damaged in the "Ash Wednesday" Storm and that station's equipment had been shipped across to Fort Miles by a Navy Landing Ship, Tank (LST). The Terminal Building was at Battery Herring with administration and barracks facilities further north. The array was reconnected at Lewes by the cable ship Neptune. NAVFAC Lewes would continue to operate until 30 September 1981. Since the SOSUS program was not officially declassified until 1991, the actual operations of NAVFAC Lewes remained classified for the duration of the facility's existence. The headquarters building that also contained some quarters, eating and recreation facilities, became a Naval Reserve Center until all land was returned to the state in 1996. That building remains as the Biden Environmental Conference Center. A married housing complex became facilities for the University of Delaware College of Earth, Ocean and Environmental Sciences.

Present
Battery Smith originally housed the two  guns and is now in use by Cape Henlopen State Park for storage. Battery Herring, originally covered with sand like all the other batteries, was excavated and expanded for use as NAVFAC Lewes. That structure was removed with the former administration and barracks facility now a conference center. Battery Hunter is in use currently as a Hawk Watch station. Battery 519 originally housed two  guns. It is currently being renovated for use as a museum, celebrating Delaware's part in World War II. Tours began in 2004. It has a restored 12-inch gun similar to the original mounted at the south gun block. Additionally, it is being used to house a German-built 20 mm anti-aircraft cannon, captured from U-858 after its surrender. A former  railway gun, converted as a  test weapon, is also on site. Four Panama mounts still exist at Battery 22, located near the Beach House within the park.

Walking tours of the bunkers and other facilities currently being restored are available during the summer.  The project falls under the purview of the Delaware Department of Natural Resources and Environmental Control (DNREC).  Historic interpreters can be seen at the park during special events.  These events are designed to give the public a demonstration of military life at Fort Miles when it was still in operation. Reenactors at the fort portray the 261st Coast Artillery Battalion and Detachment A, 1252nd Service Command Support Unit (Quartermaster Corps). Several fire control towers remain around Fort Miles; at least one is publicly accessible.

See also
 198th Signal Battalion (United States) – lineage of 261st CA Battalion
 Seacoast defense in the United States
 United States Army Coast Artillery Corps

References

Bibliography 
 
 
 Gaines, William C., Coast Artillery Organizational History, 1917-1950, Coast Defense Journal, vol. 23, issue 2, pp. 14, 25-27 - Regular Army regiments 1–196
 Gaines, William C., Historical Sketches Coast Artillery Regiments, 1917-1950, National Guard Army regiments 197–265

External links 

Fort Miles.org
The Fort Miles Historical Association
Fire Control Tower contemporary photographs
Fort Miles at American Forts Network
Fort Miles at FortWiki.com
Map of Harbor Defenses of the Delaware at FortWiki.com
Harbor Defenses of the Delaware at the Coast Defense Study Group

+

Government buildings completed in 1941
Infrastructure completed in 1941
Coastal fortifications
Miles
Buildings and structures in Sussex County, Delaware
Miles
Historic districts on the National Register of Historic Places in Delaware
1941 establishments in Delaware
National Register of Historic Places in Sussex County, Delaware